Vanashimakhi is a rural locality (a selo) in Karamakhinsky Selsoviet, Buynaksky District, Republic of Dagestan, Russia. The population was 281 as of 2010. There are 4 streets.

Geography 
Vanashimakhi is located 36 km southeast of Buynaksk (the district's administrative centre) by road. Chabanmakhi is the nearest rural locality.

References 

Rural localities in Buynaksky District